Walter Joseph "Moose" Moryn (April 12, 1926 – July 21, 1996) was an American Major League Baseball outfielder. A native of St. Paul, Minnesota, Moryn's professional baseball career began in 1948 after he served in the United States Navy in the Pacific Theater of Operations during World War II. He played in the Majors from  through  for the Brooklyn Dodgers, Chicago Cubs, St. Louis Cardinals and Pittsburgh Pirates.

Moryn appeared in 785 games played over eight big-league seasons, collecting 667 hits, with 116 doubles, 16 triples and 101 home runs. He had 354 runs batted in, and batted .266.  He spent four successive seasons (1956–59) as a regular outfielder for the Cubs, the first two as a right fielder and the latter pair as a left fielder, and he swatted 82 of his career homers during that period.

Moryn's career highlight was a dramatic shoe-string catch on the last out of the May 15, 1960, no-hitter by Don Cardwell of the Cubs. Cardwell's gem came in his Cubs debut after being acquired in a trade. Moryn himself was traded exactly a month later, at the trading deadline, when he was sent to the Cardinals. He was a member of the National League team for the 25th anniversary 1958 All-Star Game, but did not play in the game.

Moryn died of a heart attack in Winfield, Illinois, at the age of 70, and is buried in Assumption Cemetery in Wheaton.

References

Sources

1926 births
1996 deaths
United States Navy personnel of World War II
Baseball players from Saint Paul, Minnesota
Brooklyn Dodgers players
Chicago Cubs players
Danville Dodgers players
Major League Baseball outfielders
National League All-Stars
Mobile Bears players
Montreal Royals players
Pittsburgh Pirates players
St. Paul Saints (AA) players
St. Louis Cardinals players
Sheboygan Indians players